The Tomorrow Show with Keven Undergaro is a two-hour evening podcast that airs on Monday and Thursday at 7:00 PM, PST.

The show can be viewed at www.thetomorrowshow.com as well as listened to through download services such as iTunes.

Format
The show advertises that its content centers around "one celebrity boyfriend's mid-life crisis" (Keven Undergaro, fiance of E! Host Maria Menounos) and "millennials in Star Trek costumes" based on Undergaro's love of Star Trek and classic television and movies. To the latter, all hosts and staff wear custom tailored Star Trek costumes. Each member carries official Tomorrow Show rank with Undergaro being the Captain and Executive Producer Menounos serving as Admiral. The show is geared to "nocturnals, dreamers, visionaries, escapists, the socially awkward and those with Peter Pan Syndrome" and considers itself "the underdog's best friend."

The show features a space age set with a bar as well as a wide range of guests including producers, actors, television personalities, writers and various persons of interest. There is also a "Tomorrow Show Party Van" with bean bag chairs, shag rugs and lava lamps for guests.

The show launched on March 14, 2016, with the inaugural guest being Undergaro’s fiancé, Maria Menounos.

Regular segments
Undergaro often teaches lessons about life and career through metaphors via the use of old clips from film, television, YouTube and even wrestling. Some highlighted clips were from the Rockford Files, Hawaii Five-O and of course, Star Trek. Captain Lou Albano's promo with the Golden Terror is often shown to celebrities to inspire them such as CBS Criminal Minds''' star Kirsten Vangsness. When Little Women: LA star Terra Jolé was a guest, she was treated to the first "Tall People Toss" where Undergaro and other crew were tossed across the studio for Jolé's amusement.

Undergaro is also openly perplexed by the lifestyle and belief of the millennials.

Undergaro is an avid boxing fan and dedicated a show to the passing of Muhammad Ali.

Undergaro often chats with long-time friend Joe Gear on the show.

Sean "X-Pac" Waltman frequently joins the show as a co-host.

Undergaro often discusses starting a detective agency, and even had a real private investigator on as a guest.

Catchphrases
“Friday is for the men."  Friday is the worker's day leaving Thursday night free to stay up late and drink.

Notable guests
 Russell Simmons
 Kirsten Vangsness
 Terra Jole
 Ross Mathews
 Farrah Abraham
 Randall Emmett
 Lucy Walsh
 Aimee Garcia
 Maz Jobrani
 Justin Hires
 J.D. Roth
 Chuck Saftler
 Cerina Vincent
 Illeana Douglas
 Ben Gleib
Craig Gass
Brandi Glanville
Eric Braeden
Barbie Blank
Ed Asner
Sean Waltman
Burt Ward
Christy Hemme
Julie Spira
Tara Reid
Sam Roberts
John Edward
Lainie Kazan
Chad Michael Murray
Mira Sorvino
Dan Cortese
Carol Alt
Drita D'Avanzo
Jamie Otis
Matt Iseman
Alan Thicke
Florence Henderson
Amy Phillips
Diamond Dallas Page
Amber & Jim Marchese
Jason Nash
Christy Gibel
Kurt Yaeger
Stan Lee 
Dorinda Medley
Heather Thomson
Jon Taffer
Megan Batoon
Carson Kressley 
Lilian Garcia
Deana Martin
Nancy Kerrigan
George Takei
Brant Pinvidic
Eden Sassoon
Jessica Lowndes
Lala Kent
Janice Dickinson
David Cassidy
Nichelle Nichols
Courtney Stodden
Scheana Marie
Ricky Williams
Bo Derek
Laila Ali
Kim DePaola
Honey Boo Boo
Jim Norton
Amber Rose
Jim Florentine
Angie Everhart 
Corey Feldman 
Ashley Iaconetti
Nikki Leigh
Kyle Richards
Brant Pinvidic
Chase McNary
Paul Sorvino
Carl Reiner
Cristen Metoyer
Ariane Andrew
Tom Sandoval
Alison Arngrim
Daniel Maguire
Ryan Cabrera
David Crane
Patti Stanger
Ashley Lauren
Aleks Paunovic

Guest hosts
J.D. Roth filled in as the first guest host on May 16, 2016.
 Illeana Douglas stepped in as guest host on June 2, 2016.
Lilian Garcia served as guest host on August 8, 2016.
Scheana Marie filled in as guest host on February 3, 2017.
Eden Sassoon was in charge of the captain's chair as guest host on May 4,2017.
Matt Iseman served as guest host on June 15, 2017.
Lala Kent stepped in as guest host on September 8, 2017.
Sam Roberts stunk up the place on September 25, 2017.
Maria Menounos led the show as guest host on September 28, 2017.

Staff
 Host/Captain: Keven Undergaro
 Executive Producer/Admiral: Maria Menounos
 Co-host/Lt. Commander: Roxy Striar
 Co-host/Lt. Commander: Ian Keiser
 Executive Producer/Commander: Christian Bladt
 Producer/Commander: Jared Gilkerson aka "Jared at 32"
 Associate Producer/Ensign: Lauren "Lolo" LoGrasso 
 Yoeman: "Pantene" Katie Campbell

Milestones
On March 13, 2017, The Tomorrow Show'' reached their 100th episode.

References

External links
 Official website
 iTunes Tomorrow Show Page

Audio podcasts
American talk radio programs